Rajah or Raja is a monarch or princely ruler in South and Southeast Asia.

Rajah may also refer to:

 Rajah (comics), a fictional character in the Marvel Universe
 Rajah, an orange-striped tiger from Disney's Aladdin

People
 A. M. Rajah (1929–1989), playback singer
 Indranee Rajah (born 1963), Deputy Speaker of Singapore's Parliament
 Rajah Humabon, Muslim king of the Philippines, during the 16th century
 Rajah Lakandula, Muslim king of the Philippines, during the 16th century
 Rajah Muthiah Chettiar, Tamil banker, educationist, philanthropist, and politician
 Ra'Jah O'Hara, American drag queen
 Rajah Sulayman (1558–1575), Muslim king of the Philippines, during the 16th century
 Rogers Hornsby (1896–1963), professional baseball player for the St. Louis Cardinals. He was nicknamed "The Rajah"
 Rajah Caruth (born 2002), American NASCAR driver

Organisms
 Rajah butterflies, certain brush-footed butterflies in the genus Charaxes
 Culex rajah, a culicine mosquito species
 Nepenthes rajah, a pitcher plant species
 Rajah Brooke's birdwing, the swallowtail butterfly species Trogonoptera brookiana
 Rajah (dog), famed New Zealand German Shepherd police dog
 Rajah scops owl, the owl species Otus brookii
 Rajah spiny rat, the rodent species Maxomys rajah
 Toxorhynchites rajah, a toxorhynchitine mosquito species

Places
 Ayer Rajah, an area located in the Queenstown Planning Area in the south-west part of Singapore
 Rajah Buayan, a municipality in the Philippines
 Rajah Buayan, Maguindanao, a municipality in the Philippines

Things
 Ayer Rajah Expressway, a Singapore expressway
 , an escort aircraft carrier 
 Rajah Broadcasting Network, a Philippine media network
 Rajah Motors, former automobile manufacturer in India
 Rajah Sulaiman Movement, a terrorist organization
 The Rajah (play), an 1883 play
 The Rajah (1911 film), a silent short film
 The Rajah (1919 film), a film starring Harold Lloyd
 The Rajah (album), a 1985 album by Lee Morgan

Others
 Rajah Broadcasting Network, Philippine broadcasting company

See also
 Raja (disambiguation)
 Rajput
 Raj (disambiguation)
 Raju (disambiguation)
 Maharaj
 Rana (disambiguation)
 Rai (surname)
 Rajiv